H. Jay Melosh (June 23, 1947 – September 11, 2020) was an American geophysicist specialising in impact cratering. He earned a degree in physics from Princeton University and a doctoral degree in physics and geology from Caltech in 1972. His PhD thesis concerned quarks.  Melosh's research interests include impact craters, planetary tectonics, and the physics of earthquakes and landslides. His recent research includes studies of the giant impact origin of the moon, the Chicxulub impact that is thought to have extinguished most dinosaurs, and studies of ejection of rocks from their parent bodies. He was active in astrobiological studies that relate chiefly to the exchange of microorganisms between the terrestrial planets (a process known as panspermia or transpermia).  

Melosh was a member of the American Geophysical Union, Geological Society of America, Meteoritical Society, American Astronomical Society (Division of Planetary Sciences,) and the American Association for the Advancement of Science. He was the recipient of the Barringer Medal of the Meteoritical Society for his work on the physics of impact, and of the G. K. Gilbert Award from the Geological Society of America. He was elected to the National Academy of Sciences in 2003.

Awards and honors
 Asteroid 8216 Melosh is named in his honor.
 The American Geophysical Union 2008 Harry H. Hess Medal - for “outstanding achievements in research in the constitution and evolution of Earth and sister planets.”

Publications
  
   Planetary Surface Processes, Cambridge University Press, 2011,

References

External links
Homepage of H. Jay Melosh

American geophysicists
Members of the United States National Academy of Sciences
1947 births
2020 deaths
Planetary scientists
American Astronomical Society
Writers from Paterson, New Jersey
Scientists from New Jersey
Barringer Medal winners